McDuff, The Talking Dog was a Saturday morning live action television program that aired on NBC in 1976. The show centered on the ghost of a 100-year-old sheepdog who used to live in the home now owned by a veterinarian, Dr. Calvin Campbell (played by Walter Willison). McDuff (voice provided by Jack Lester) could talk not only to the other animals, but also to Dr. Campbell. However, Dr. Campbell was the only person who could hear or see McDuff, which often led to wacky situations.

Dr. Campbell's neighbor, Amos Ferguson, was played by Gordon Jump.

Broadcast history
At the beginning of the 1976-77 television season, McDuff, the Talking Dog was part of a three-hour block of six live action shows aired on Saturday mornings on NBC, alongside Land of the Lost, which was entering its third season, and four other new shows: Monster Squad, Big John, Little John, The Kids from C.A.P.E.R. and Muggsy. None of the six shows returned for the beginning of 1977–78 season, with McDuff being the first casualty. It was cancelled after only two months—after airing only 11 of the 13 episodes that had been produced. The original films were lost in a fire making a release of this material impossible.

Cast
The cast included:

 Walter Willison: Dr. Calvin Campbell
 Jack Lester: McDuff (voice)
 Michelle Stacy: Kimmy Campbell
 Gordon Jump: Amos Ferguson
 Johnnie Collins III: Squeaky
 Monty Margetts: Mrs. Osgood

References

External links
 McDuff, the Talking Dog page
 

1976 American television series debuts
1976 American television series endings
1970s American children's television series
NBC original programming
Individual dogs
Lost television shows
Television series about ghosts
Television shows about dogs